Omnigraphics is a publishing company located in Detroit, Michigan founded by Frederick Gale Ruffner, Jr. and his son Peter in 1985. The company was acquired by Aggregate Intelligence in 2015. 
 It was sold to Infobase Publishing in 2022.

References

External links
 Omnigraphics website

Book publishing companies based in Michigan
Companies based in Detroit
Publishing companies established in 1985
1985 establishments in Michigan